Cryptocarya wightiana is a small tree or shrub found in Indian Subcontinent.

Fruits
Purplish black, globosa, smooth, shining drupe.

Ecology
Rain forest subcanopy.

Uses
Wood - rafters, construction.

Culture
Known as "gulu mora" ( ගුලු මොර ) in Sinhala.

References

 http://www.biotik.org/india/species/c/crypwigh/crypwigh_en.html
 http://lauraceae.myspecies.info/category/lauraceae/lauraceae/cryptocarya/cryptocarya-wightiana-griffithii
 http://iucnredlist.org/details/32590/0
 http://nopr.niscair.res.in/bitstream/123456789/24293/1/IJCB%2040B(12)%201287-1288.pdf
 http://indiabiodiversity.org/species/show/9845

Flora of Sri Lanka
wightiana